The 2010–11 KIJHL season was the 44th season of the Kootenay International Junior Hockey League. Eighteen teams played 52 games each during the regular season schedule, which started on September 10, 2010 and ended on February 12, 2011.

The playoffs began shortly after the regular season ended, and ended at the end April, with the Osoyoos Coyotes awarded the KIJHL Championship, and a berth in the 2011 Cyclone Taylor Cup, hosted by the Fernie Ghostriders in Fernie, British Columbia, at the Fernie Memorial Arena.

All-Star Game 
The 2011 KIJHL All-Star Game was played on January 15, 2011 in Fernie, British Columbia at the Fernie Memorial Arena.

The Kootenay Conference All-Stars defeated the Okanagan/Shuswap Conference All-Stars 10-3.

Mike Wiest (F) of the Castlegar Rebels was the Kootenay Conference Player Of The Game with 3 points and scored the Game Winning Goal.

Garrett Rockafellow (G) of the Revelstoke Grizzlies was the Okanagan/Shuswap Player Of The Game.

Standings

Kootenay Conference

Okanagan/Shuswap Conference

Playoffs

Bracket

Division Semifinals

Eddie Mountain Division Semifinals

(EM1) Fernie Ghostriders vs. (EM4) Kimberley Dynamiters

(EM2) Creston Valley Thunder Cats vs. (EM3) Golden Rockets

Neil Murdoch Division Semifinals

(NM1) Castlegar Rebels vs. (NM4) Spokane Braves

(NM2) Beaver Valley Nitehawks vs. (NM3) Nelson Leafs

Doug Birks Division Semifinals

(DB1) Revelstoke Grizzlies vs. (DB4) North Okanagan Knights

(DB2) Kamloops Storm vs. (DB3) Sicamous Eagles

Okanagan Division Semifinals

(O1) Osoyoos Coyotes vs. (O4) Penticton Lakers

(O2) Kelowna Chiefs vs. (O3) Princeton Posse

Division Finals

Eddie Mountain Division Finals

(EM1) Fernie Ghostriders vs. (EM2) Creston Valley Thunder Cats

Neil Murdoch Division Finals

(NM1) Castlegar Rebels vs. (NM2) Beaver Valley Nitehawks

Doug Birks Division Finals

(DB1) Revelstoke Grizzlies vs. (DB2) Kamloops Storm

Okanagan Division Finals

(O1) Osoyoos Coyotes vs. (O2) Kelowna Chiefs

Conference Finals

Kootenay Conference Final

(EM1) Fernie Ghostriders vs. (NM1) Castlegar Rebels

Okanagan Conference Final

(O1) Osoyoos Coyotes vs. (DB1) Revelstoke Grizzlies

KIJHL Championship Final

(O1) Osoyoos Coyotes vs. (NM1) Castlegar Rebels

KIJHL awards

Player stats

Scoring leaders 
The following players led the league in points at the conclusion of the regular season.

  
GP = Games played; G = Goals; A = Assists; Pts = Points; PIM = Penalty minutes

Leading goaltenders 
The following goaltenders led the league in goals against average at the end of the regular season.

GP = Games played; Min = Minutes played; W = Wins; L = Losses; T = Ties; GA = Goals against; SO = Shutouts; SV% = Save percentage; GAA = Goals against average

Playoff player stats

Scoring leaders 
The following players led the league in points at the conclusion of the playoffs.

  
GP = Games played; G = Goals; A = Assists; Pts = Points; PIM = Penalty minutes

Leading goaltenders 
The following goaltenders led the league in goals against average at the end of the playoffs.

GP = Games played; Min = Minutes played; W = Wins; L = Losses; T = Ties; GA = Goals against; SO = Shutouts; SV% = Save percentage; GAA = Goals against average

Suspensions

Trades

See also
 2010 in ice hockey
 2011 in ice hockey
 Kootenay International Junior Hockey League

External links
 Official website of the Kootenay International Junior Hockey League

References

Kootenay International Junior Hockey League
KIJHL
KIJHL